"Los Favoritos" is a young Puerto Rican pop group formed in 2008 by the top eight former participants in the competition "Objetivo Fama": Arquímides, Blanca Rosa, Ediberto, Javier, Jometh, Jonathan, Luz Maria, Mary Ann Acevedo and an accomplice Francisco Zamora. Two of them, Javier Baerga Schroeder and Luz Maria, have left the group to record solo albums.

Los Favoritos: The Show
"Los Favoritos: The Show" was produced by Francisco Zamora, Karlo Cabrera and Guillermo Torres. Danny Lugo was the choreographer. Its target audience was the general public, especially families.

On January 25, 2009, "Los Favoritos" presented a concert in the Coliseo Ruben Rodriguez at Bayamon, Puerto Rico, in the continue of the concert tour 2008–2009.

Tour

Special Presentations
This October 30, 2008, parts of "Los Favoritos" were presented in the "Pabellón de la Paz" in San Juan. Mary Ann Acevedo, Arquimides, Ediberto, Blanca Rosa, Jonathan, Jometh and Francisco Zamora did a spoof on the official theme of their show in "El Segundo Encuentro de Organizaciones Juveniles de Puerto Rico" (hosted by the OAJ - "Oficina de Asuntos de la Juventud"). 

"Los Favoritos" was presented on November 22, 2008, in "El Pulguero de las Christmas" at the parking lot of Estadio Hiram Bithorn at Hato Rey, Puerto Rico. That same day, "Los Favoritos" appeared at Cabo Rojo, Puerto Rico in the reception for Miss Puerto Rico Universe 2009, Mayra Matos.

Discography
EP
Tu Favorito (2008)

See also
Objetivo Fama
Mary Ann Acevedo

External links
Los Favoritos at CeluMusic
Los Favoritos: The Show at Official Website
Los Favoritos: The Show at MySpace Music

References

Puerto Rican musical groups